MTR Metro Cammell EMU may refer to:
 MTR Metro Cammell EMU (AC), also known as the Mid-Life Refurbishment (MLR) Train, serving the East Rail line
 MTR Metro Cammell EMU (DC), also known as the M-Train or Modernization Train, serving the Kwun Tong, Tsuen Wan, Island, Tseung Kwan O and Disneyland Resort lines